The  is a constituency that represents Fukushima Prefecture in the House of Councillors in the Diet of Japan. It currently has three Councillors in the 242-member house.

Outline
From the first House of Councillors election in 1947 until the 2010 election, Fukushima elected four Councillors to six-year terms, two each at alternating elections held every three years. In September 2012 Fukushima had 1,627,518
registered voters, the lowest of the 12 prefectures that were represented by 4 Councillors at that time. By comparison, the three most populous districts of Hokkaido, Hyogo at-large district and Fukuoka districts each had more than 4 million voters but were also represented by four Councillors each. To address this malapportionment, a November 2012 amendment to the Public Offices Election Law reduced Fukushima's (and Gifu's) representation to two Councillors. This change began to take effect at the 2013 election, when only one Councillor was elected in Fukushima, and will be completed at the 2016 election. The district has 1,607,908 registered voters as of September 2015.

The Councillors currently representing Fukushima are:
 Mitsuhide Iwaki (Liberal Democratic Party (LDP), third term; term ends in 2016) Was appointed as the Minister of Justice in October 2015.
 Teruhiko Mashiko (Democratic Party of Japan (DPJ), second term; term ends in 2016)
 Masako Mori (LDP, second term; term ends in 2019)

Elected Councillors

Election results

See also
List of districts of the House of Councillors of Japan
Fukushima 3rd district, one of Fukushima Prefecture's five districts in the House of Representatives

References 

Districts of the House of Councillors (Japan)